John Odie (born 5 July 1964) is a Kenyan footballer. He played in two matches for the Kenya national football team in 1993. He was also named in Kenya's squad for the 1990 African Cup of Nations tournament.

References

1964 births
Living people
Kenyan footballers
Kenya international footballers
1990 African Cup of Nations players
Place of birth missing (living people)
Association footballers not categorized by position